Diathrausta brevifascialis is a moth in the family Crambidae. It was described by Wileman in 1911. It is found in Japan and Taiwan.

The wingspan is about 18 mm.

References

Moths described in 1911
Spilomelinae